Hammett may refer to:

 Hammett L. Bowen, Jr. (1947–1969), Medal of Honor recipient
 Hammett Pinhey Hill (1876–1942), politician

Surname
 Benjamin Hammett, Sheriff of the City of London, 1788 
 Bryant Hammett (born 1956), Louisiana politician 
 Charles Hammett (fl. 1910–1919), American college football coach
 Dashiell Hammett (1894–1961), author of novels The Maltese Falcon and The Thin Man
 John Yurmet, Puerto Rican wrestler, aka "Mr. 450" Hammett
 Kirk Hammett (born 1962), guitarist for the heavy metal band Metallica
 Louis Plack Hammett (1894–1987), physical chemist who developed the Hammett equation
 Mark Hammett (born 1972), New Zealand rugby player
 Seth Hammett (born 1946), U.S. politician in Alabama
 William H. Hammett (died 1861), U.S. Representative from Mississippi

See also

 Cornish surnames
 Curtin–Hammett principle
 ESP Kirk Hammett
 Hammett (film), 1982 film about writer Dashiell Hammett
 Hammett Prize
 Hammett, Georgia, a community in the United States
 Hammett acidity function
 Hammett equation, based on the Hammett substituent constants sigma

Cornish-language surnames